Readout may refer to:

 Digital read out, type of electronic display
 Quantum readout, cryptographic authentication technique
 Read Out!, Canadian television series
 Readout integrated circuit

See also
 Redoubt (disambiguation)